Eyüp Yiğittürk was a Turkish equestrian. He competed in two events at the 1948 Summer Olympics.

References

External links

Year of birth missing
1998 deaths
Turkish male equestrians
Olympic equestrians of Turkey
Equestrians at the 1948 Summer Olympics
Place of birth missing